Michael or Mike McLeod may refer to:

Michael McLeod (ice hockey) (born 1998), Canadian ice hockey player
Michael McLeod (politician) (born 1959), Canadian politician
Mike McLeod (athlete) (born 1952), British runner
Mike McLeod (gridiron football) (born 1958), American football player
Mike McLeod (actor) (born 1985), Canadian film and television actor
Michael McLeod (journalist), American journalist who has written about Bigfoot
Michael McLeod (musician), Australian bassist and clean vocalist